Babalo Madikizela is a South African urban planner and politician who served as the Eastern Cape MEC for Public Works from May 2019 to July 2022 and as a Member of the Eastern Cape Provincial Legislature from November 2018 to August 2022. Madikizela served as the provincial treasurer of the African National Congress (ANC) from October 2017 to May 2022.

Early life and education
Madikizela was born in village of Mbhongweni, Bizana in the previous Cape Province, which became the Eastern Cape in 1994. He attended St. John's College from which he matriculated. He obtained a national diploma in town and regional planning from the ML Sultan Technikon, now the Durban University of Technology.

Career
Madikizela started his career as a planner for the Municipal Mentoring Programme (MMP) and later found employment as a housing manager at the Ingquza Hill Local Municipality. He then worked for a Wimpy restaurant in Mthatha and soon worked in the construction industry.

Madikizela joined the African National Congress Youth League (ANCYL) at a young age. He served on the youth league's regional and provincial structures. He proceeded to serve on an ANC regional structure as an additional member and was later elected treasurer.

On 1 October 2017, Madikizela was elected provincial treasurer of the ANC. He was deployed to the provincial legislature in November 2018 and took office as an MPL on 13 November. On 18 November, premier Phumulo Masualle appointed Madikizela as MEC for Human Settlements. He assumed office on 21 November.

Following the May 2019 provincial election, premier Oscar Mabuyane appointed Madikizela as the Member of the Executive Council for Public Works. After his swearing-in, he availed himself for a lifestyle audit as he is accused of fraud and corruption by businessman Lonwabo Bam. Madikizela denies the allegations.

In May 2022, Madikizela challenged Oscar Mabuyane for provincial chairperson of the ANC in the Eastern Cape. He lost to Mabuyane, receiving only 662 votes to Mabuyane's 812 votes. Zolile Williams replaced him as provincial treasurer. After his defeat, Madikizela announced that he would resigning from the provincial government. He announced on 28 July 2022 that he would be leaving office the following day. He said that he would remain Member of the Provincial Legislature. Premier Mabuyane appointed Xolile Nqatha as the acting MEC for the portfolio until a permanent replacement had been appointed. Madikizela resigned from the Provincial Legislature on 2 August 2022. On 16 August, Ntombovuyo Nkopane became the new MEC for Public Works.

References

External links

Living people
African National Congress politicians
People from the Eastern Cape
Xhosa people
Members of the Eastern Cape Provincial Legislature
People from Mbizana Local Municipality
People from Alfred Nzo District Municipality
Politicians from the Eastern Cape
20th-century South African politicians
21st-century South African politicians
Year of birth missing (living people)